Alexandra Keresztesi (26 April 1983 in Budapest) is a Hungarian-born Argentine sprint canoer who has competed since the mid first decade of the 21st century. She won two gold medals in the K-4 1000 m event at the ICF Canoe Sprint World Championships, earning them in 2006 and 2007.

She is currently married to Miguel Correa, an Olympic Argentine paddler who took the 5th place of k2 200m at the 2012 Summer Olympics.

References

External links 
 
 
 

1983 births
Living people
Hungarian emigrants to Argentina
Hungarian expatriates in Argentina
Hungarian female canoeists
Argentine female canoeists
Naturalized citizens of Argentina
Canoeists at the 2011 Pan American Games
Canoeists at the 2015 Pan American Games
Pan American Games silver medalists for Argentina
Pan American Games bronze medalists for Argentina
ICF Canoe Sprint World Championships medalists in kayak
Canoeists from Budapest
Olympic canoeists of Argentina
Canoeists at the 2016 Summer Olympics
Pan American Games medalists in canoeing
Medalists at the 2011 Pan American Games
Medalists at the 2015 Pan American Games